Gary Bollan (born 24 March 1973) is a Scottish professional football player and coach.

He played for Dundee United (two spells), Rangers, Wolverhampton Wanderers (loan), St Johnstone, Livingston, Motherwell, Clyde, Brechin City and Carnoustie Panmure. He also played for the Scotland national under-21 football team.

He started his managerial career with his former playing club Livingston, and he has since managed Airdrieonians, Forfar Athletic and Cowdenbeath.

Playing career
Bollan came up through the youth system and into the first team at Dundee United as a teenager in the early 1990s. He sparked interest from Rangers, who signed him in January 1995. Bollan spent three years at Ibrox but made only a handful of appearances due to injury. He was transferred to St Johnstone in 1998 and spent three years there.

A move to Heart of Midlothian stalled in March 2001 due to a failed medical before Bollan moved to First Division champions Livingston four months later. His appearance for Livingston in the UEFA Cup meant that he had made appearances for four different Scottish clubs in European competition. He returned to Dundee United in February 2003 for a year, before having a brief spell with Motherwell in 2004. In August 2004, Bollan began the first of two spells with Clyde, joining as a player/coach.

He spent the 2004–05 season as a player-coach for Clyde. He made his debut on the opening day of the season, in Clyde's derby win over rivals Partick Thistle. He is best known for his time at Broadwood Stadium, when he scored a free-kick from 40 yards to knock Falkirk out of the Scottish Cup. He was voted Clyde man of the match in their encounter with Celtic in the latter stages of the competition. He was briefly caretaker manager at the end of the season. Bollan signed for Brechin in July 2005 but was made available for transfer shortly afterwards. In November 2006, Gary Bollan signed for Carnoustie Panmure.

Coaching career

Early career
In July 2007, Bollan was appointed as Head of Youth Development at Clyde, though he has appeared in the dugout in a coaching role since January 2008, and was in joint-caretaker charge of the team alongside Dougie Bell for two matches after the resignation of Colin Hendry. In April 2009, following reported financial troubles at Clyde, Bollan left the club.

Livingston
On 14 August 2009, Bollan became the new manager of his former club, Livingston. In October 2009, Bollan won SFL manager of the month following three victories and a draw in the league and a 3–1 victory over Queen's Park in the Scottish Cup 2nd Round. He followed this up by winning it again the following month, winning three out of three in the league. Bollan then won Third Division Manager of the Year, after leading his team to promotion by a margin of 15 points. Livingston won promotion from the Second Division, but Bollan was sacked by Livingston in February 2012. The club cited his alleged failure to develop young players as their reason for his dismissal.

Airdrieonians
In October 2013, Bollan was appointed manager of Scottish League One club Airdrieonians. The club were bottom of League One when he took over, but after a while getting settled and strengthening the squad, a strong finish to the season saw them avoid relegation.  A fine run of form, in which they lost just one game (away to Rangers) in their last 16 fixtures saw them finish in sixth place, having secured their League One status with two games to spare. In May 2014 Bollan's contract was extended until May 2016.

Forfar Athletic
Bollan left his position as manager of Airdrieonians in December 2015 to take over from Dick Campbell at fellow League One side Forfar Athletic. However, he was unable to avoid relegation to Scottish League Two. He guided them back to the third tier via the play-offs in the following season, in which the club led for most of the season before missing out on the final day to Arbroath. Bollan was sacked by Forfar in September 2017, after a run of defeats culminated in a 5–0 defeat at Arbroath.

Cowdenbeath
After less than two months without a club, Bollan was appointed manager of Scottish League Two side Cowdenbeath on 14 November 2017. He took over a struggling club, fighting for existence and relegation from the Scottish Professional Football League. Despite some decent results, the "Blue Brazil" still finished bottom at the end of the season. Bollan led the club to safety after beating Highland Football League champions Cove Rangers in the Scottish League Two play-offs in May 2018.

Bollan left Cowdenbeath in October 2021, after the club lost a Scottish Cup tie against Lowland League side Civil Service Strollers.

Career statistics

Player

Managerial record

Honours and achievements

Player
Dundee United
Scottish Cup: 1993–94

Manager
Livingston
Scottish Third Division: 2009–10
Scottish Second Division: 2010–11

Forfar Athletic
Scottish League One play-offs: 2016–17

Cowdenbeath
Scottish League Two play-offs: 2017–18

See also
1990–91 Dundee United F.C. season; 1991–92; 1992–93; 1993–94; 1994–95; 2002–03; 2003–04
2004–05 Clyde F.C. season

References

External links

1973 births
Airdrieonians F.C. managers
Association football fullbacks
Brechin City F.C. players
Carnoustie Panmure F.C. players
Clyde F.C. non-playing staff
Clyde F.C. players
Cowdenbeath F.C. managers
Dundee United F.C. players
Forfar Athletic F.C. managers
Living people
Livingston F.C. managers
Livingston F.C. players
Motherwell F.C. players
Rangers F.C. players
Scotland under-21 international footballers
Scotland youth international footballers
Scottish Football League managers
Scottish Football League players
Scottish football managers
Scottish footballers
Scottish Junior Football Association players
Scottish Premier League players
Footballers from Dundee
St Johnstone F.C. players
Wolverhampton Wanderers F.C. players
Albion Rovers F.C. players
Scottish Professional Football League managers